The Crișul Repede (Romanian Crișul Repede ("the rapid Criș"); Hungarian Sebes-Körös) is a river in Bihor County, Crișana, Romania and in southeastern Hungary (Körösvidek). Together with the rivers Crișul Alb ("the white Criș") and Crișul Negru ("the black Criș"), it makes up the Three Criș rivers ("Cele Trei Crișuri"). These are considered the main rivers in the Crișana region of Romania. Historically, when Crișana was recognised as an official region (today, Romania is divided into 40 counties), the Criș rivers were the most important in the region.

The Crișul Repede runs through the city of Oradea, the capital of Bihor county. It flows into the Körös (Criș) near Gyomaendrőd, in Hungary. Part of the water from the Crișul Repede is diverted towards the Crișul Negru by the Criș Collector Canal.

Towns and villages
The following towns and villages are situated along the Crișul Repede, from source to mouth: 
In Romania: Izvoru Crișului, Huedin, Poieni, Ciucea, Negreni, Bucea, Bulz, Bratca, Vadu Crișului, Aușeu, Aleșd, Tileagd, and Oradea.
In Hungary: Körösszakál, Körösújfalu, and Körösladány.

Tributaries
The following rivers are tributaries to the Crișul Repede (from source to mouth):

Left: Șipot, Domoș, Călata, Săcuieu, Drăgan, Surduc, Neportoc, Valea Satului, Iad, Valea Boiului, Brătcuța, Misir, Dobrinești, Râciu, Mnierea, Cropandă, Medeș, Chijic, Sărand, Tășad, Bonor, Peța, Alceu, Corhana
Right: Poicu, Semeni, Negrea, Beznea, Borod, Pârâul Omului, Gepiș, Izvor, Huta, Uileac, Bonda, Pasteur, Barcău

References

Rivers of Hungary
Rivers of Romania
Rivers of Cluj County
Rivers of Bihor County
International rivers of Europe